Brendan Bradley (born 7 June 1950) is an Irish former footballer. He holds the record for the highest number of goals, 235, scored by an individual in the League of Ireland with a club record 181 for Finn Harps

Career

Derry City
A talented youngster, appearing in the Derry and District League at the age of 15, Bradley signed for Derry City at the age of sixteen. Although a regular in the club's reserve team he only made a handful of first team appearances during his three seasons with the club; his route to the first team being blocked by the form of regular striker Danny Hale.

Finn Harps
Despite his limited appearances for Derry, Bradley had impressed Finn Harps manager Patsy McGowan and a fee of £100 secured Bradley's services for the Harps' League of Ireland debut season, 1969–1970. The season saw him score his and the club's first hat-trick in senior football in the away fixture with Athlone Town and his tally of 18 league goals was the highest in the league. The following season once again saw Bradley top the list of leading scorers, this time with 20 league goals whilst the 1971–1972 season saw his goal help Finn Harps secure their first major honour with a 1–0 victory over Cork Hibernians in the Dublin City Cup.

Lincoln City
In July 1972, Bradley moved to the Football League with Lincoln City manager David Herd paying £6,000 for his services. He made his league debut for the club in the 1–1 away draw with Darlington on 19 August 1972 His first goals for the club came in his third league game when he netted twice in the 3–0 away victory over Workington on 30 August 1972 and he then scored in the following four league fixtures. He went on to score 11 goals in his first 18 league appearances before Herd left as manager following the 3–1 defeat at Bradford City on 2 December 1972. Although he found the net in the new manager Graham Taylor's first game in charge, a 2–2 draw at Newport County on 16 December 1972, that would prove to be his final goal for the Imps as he failed to score in his final 12 appearances that season.

Return to Finn Harps
With Graham Taylor rebuilding the Sincil Bank based club, Bradley returned to Finn Harps for £4,000 on 22 March 1973 and ended the 1973–1974 season by scoring the final two goals as Harps won the FAI Cup with a 3–1 victory against St Patrick's Athletic at Dalymount Park. The victory saw Harps qualify for the following season's European Cup Winners Cup where they were drawn against Bursaspor. Bradley scored in the away leg, a 4–2 defeat on 18 September 1974; the 0–0 home leg on 2 October 1974 seeing the club fall out of the competition. His total of 21 league goals saw him head the league scorers chart for a third time. The 1975–1976 season saw him head the scoring charts for a fourth time with 29 league goals, which included all six in the 6–1 victory over Sligo Rovers at Finn Park. These exploits saw him voted the Soccer Writers' Association of Ireland Personality of the Year for 1976. The close season saw him head for the North American Soccer League where he made a single appearance for Toronto Metros-Croatia.

Later career
In 1978, he moved to Athlone Town before linking once more with his erstwhile Finn Harps manager Patsy McGowan at Sligo Rovers. He netted 44 league goals for the club, collecting a FAI Cup runners-up medal from the 1981 final with Dundalk. He returned to Harps for the 1982–1983 season, staying a further four seasons, before re-joining Derry City in the January 1986 season, helping the club capture the League of Ireland First Division Shield.

Post career
Bradley resides in Derry, relaxing with playing golf and walking. He resisted the urge of management after his playing retirement commenting that "it would never take the place of playing for me" and is an occasional visitor to the Brandywell Stadium. After 13 years at Finn Park he retains "a soft spot for Harps".

In 2019, Bradley was honoured with a Special Merit Award, at the 2019 FAI International Awards, for his outstanding contributions to domestic club football in Ireland.

Honours
FAI Cup
 Finn Harps F.C. 1974
Dublin City Cup
 Finn Harps F.C. 1971–72
League of Ireland First Division Shield
 Derry City F.C. 1985/86

References

External links
Lincoln City F.C. Official Archive Profile

1950 births
Living people
Association footballers from Northern Ireland
Association football forwards
Expatriate footballers in England
Derry City F.C. players
Finn Harps F.C. players
Lincoln City F.C. players
Toronto Blizzard (1971–1984) players
Athlone Town A.F.C. players
Sligo Rovers F.C. players
League of Ireland players
English Football League players
North American Soccer League (1968–1984) players
League of Ireland XI players